Sir William Gage  (1695 – 23 April 1744) of Firle Place was a British landowner and politician who sat in the House of Commons from 1727 to 1744.  He was an early patron of cricket, in association with his friend Charles Lennox, 2nd Duke of Richmond.

Early life
Gage was born in Firle, East Sussex, the third son of Sir John Gage, 4th Baronet, and his first wife Mary Stanley, daughter of Sir William Stanley, 1st Baronet, of Hooton, Cheshire. He succeeded his brother to the Baronetcy in October 1713.

Parliamentary career
The Gage family were Roman Catholic recusants but Sir William chose to conform to the established Church so that he could become an MP in 1722. His seat was the former constituency of Seaford and where he remained until his death in 1744.

Cricket career
Sir William was a keen cricketer and patron who led and backed teams. One of his teams has been credited with the earliest known innings victory. He was a close friend of Charles Lennox, 2nd Duke of Richmond and it seems they had organised a number of cricket matches before 1725 when their involvement first becomes clear through a surviving letter that Gage wrote to Richmond in humorous terms about cricket:

My Lord Duke,
I received this moment your Grace's letter and am extremely happy your Grace intends us ye honour of making one a Tuesday, and will without fail bring a gentleman with me to play against you, One that has played very seldom for these several years.
I am in great affliction with being shamefully beaten Yesterday, the first match I played this year. However I will muster up all my courage against Tuesday's engagement. I will trouble your Grace with nothing more than that I wish you Success in everything except ye Cricket Match and that I am etc. etc.
W. Gage
Firle July ye 16th 1725

Sir William's name appears in connection with a number of matches over the next few years. A game against Edwin Stead's XI on 28 August 1729 is regarded as the earliest innings victory on record. A contemporary report states that Sussex "got (within three) in one hand, as the former did in two hands, so the Kentish men threw it up". Sir William was greatly assisted by the outstanding play of Thomas Waymark "who turned the scale of victory".

In August 1733, Sir William's team challenged one backed by Frederick, Prince of Wales at Moulsey Hurst for "a wager of 100 guineas". Sir William was officially Lord Gage by then. The result of the match is unknown but it featured "11 of the best players in the county on each side". In September 1734, his Sussex team played a Kent team led by Lord John Philip Sackville in the earliest match recorded at Sevenoaks Vine. This was won by Kent. Apart from one minor fixture a few years later, that is the last record of Sir William in a cricketing context.

Death and legacy
Gage was unmarried and died without issue aged 49 on 23 April 1744. He was succeeded in the Baronetcy by his cousin Thomas Gage who, in 1754, was raised to the Peerage of Ireland as Viscount Gage.

Gage did much to develop Firle Place, including the external cladding of the building in the Georgian style, using Caen Stone.

References

Bibliography
 John Marshall, The Duke who was Cricket, Muller, 1961
 Timothy J McCann, Sussex Cricket in the Eighteenth Century, Sussex Record Society, 2004
 H T Waghorn, The Dawn of Cricket, Electric Press, 1906

1695 births
1744 deaths
Baronets in the Baronetage of England
English cricketers
English cricketers of 1701 to 1786
William
Knights Companion of the Order of the Bath
Members of the Parliament of Great Britain for English constituencies
Sussex cricketers
Cricket patrons
18th-century philanthropists